Jakob Hlasek and Yevgeny Kafelnikov were the defending champions and successfully defended their title, winning in the final 6–3, 6–3, against John-Laffnie de Jager and Wayne Ferreira.

Seeds

  Grant Connell /  Patrick Galbraith (first round)
  Cyril Suk /  Daniel Vacek (first round)
  Jakob Hlasek /  Yevgeny Kafelnikov (champions)
  Tomás Carbonell /  Francisco Roig (quarterfinals)

Draw

Draw

External links
Main Draw

1995 ATP Tour